Baeotus is a genus of butterflies in the family Nymphalidae found in Central America, the Caribbean, and South America.

Species
There are four recognised species:
Baeotus aeilus (Stoll, 1780)
Baeotus baeotus (Doubleday, 1849)
Baeotus deucalion (C. & R. Felder, 1860)
Baeotus japetus (Staudinger, 1885)

References
 "Baeotus Hemming, 1939" at Markku Savela's Lepidoptera and Some Other Life Forms

Coeini
Nymphalidae of South America
Butterfly genera
Taxa named by Francis Hemming